is a Japanese football defender who currently plays for Tokyo Verdy in the J2 League.

Career statistics
Updated to end of 2018 season.

1Includes Japanese Super Cup.

Honours
Yokohama Marinos
Emperor's Cup (1): 2013

References

External links
Profile at Tokyo Verdy

1987 births
Living people
University of Tsukuba alumni
Association football people from Kanagawa Prefecture
Japanese footballers
J1 League players
J2 League players
Japan Football League players
Sagawa Shiga FC players
Yokohama F. Marinos players
Shonan Bellmare players
Tokyo Verdy players
Association football midfielders